Lebrija may refer to:

Geography 
 Lebrija, municipality in Andalusia, Spain
 Lebrija (wine), a Spanish wine region in Andalusia 
 Lebrija, Santander, municipality in Santander, Colombia
 Lebrija River, river in Santander

People 
 Antonio de Nebrija or Lebrija (1444-1522), Spanish humanist, astronomer, poet and linguïst
 Antonio de Lebrija (1507-1540), Spanish conquistador in Colombia, possible grandson of the former
 Francisca de Lebrija, Spanish lecturer
 Miguel Lebrija (1887-1913), Mexican aviator